Black Light Syndrome is the first studio album by the supergroup Bozzio Levin Stevens, released on July 15, 1997 through Magna Carta Records. The trio consists of drummer Terry Bozzio, bassist Tony Levin and guitarist Steve Stevens, all known for their work in jazz, rock and other styles. Black Light Syndrome consists of seven original instrumentals, largely improvised in the studio.

Track listing

Personnel
Steve Stevens – guitar, pedals, production
Tony Levin – Chapman stick, bass guitar, production
Terry Bozzio – drums, percussion, production
Wyn Davis – engineering, mixing, production
Todd Langner – mixing

References

External links
Bozzio/Levin/Stevens "Black Light Syndrome" album review at Guitar Nine

Bozzio Levin Stevens albums
Steve Stevens albums
Tony Levin albums
1997 albums
Magna Carta Records albums